Footsteps and Heartbeats is the third studio album by the British folk singer/songwriter Rory McLeod, released in 1989.

Track listing
 "Love Like a Rock (In a Stormy Sea)" 
 "Till I Don't Know Who I am" 
 "Collector Man" 
 "Moments Shared" 
 "Wandering Fool" 
 "Take Me Home" 
 "Singing Copper" 
 "A Kind of Loneliness" 
 "Mariachi's Love Song"

All songs and arrangements by Rory McLeod.

1989 albums
Cooking Vinyl albums